João Sousa defeated Emil Ruusuvuori in the final, 7–6(11–9), 4–6, 6–1 to win the singles title at the 2022 Tata Open Maharashtra. Sousa saved three match points against Elias Ymer in the semifinals. This was his first title since 2018.

Jiří Veselý was the defending champion from when the tournament was last held in 2020, but lost in the quarterfinals to Ruusuvuori.

Seeds 
The top four seeds received a bye into the second round.

Draw

Finals

Top half

Bottom half

Qualifying

Seeds

Qualifiers

Qualifying draw

First qualifier

Second qualifier

Third qualifier

Fourth qualifier

References

External links
Singles draw
Qualifying draw 

Tata Open Maharashtra
Singles
Maharashtra Open